Tumbes is a province in Peru, located in the region of the same name. It borders the Pacific Ocean on the north, the Zarumilla Province on the east, the Piura Region and Ecuador on the south and the Contralmirante Villar Province on the west. Its capital is Tumbes, which is also the regional capital.

Boundaries
 North: Pacific Ocean
 East: Zarumilla Province
 South: Piura Region and Ecuador
 West: Contralmirante Villar Province

Political division
The province is divided into six districts (singular: distrito):
Tumbes
Corrales
La Cruz
Pampas de Hospital
San Jacinto
San Juan de la Virgen

References

External links
  

Provinces of the Tumbes Region